Chrysocraspeda angulosa is a species of moth of the family Geometridae first described by Claude Herbulot in 1970. It is found in northern Madagascar.

The head is reddish brown with white antennas, the upperside of the thorax is reddish brown mixed with grey, the underside and the legs are clear yellow. The length of its forewings is 13.5 mm.

References

Sterrhinae
Moths described in 1970
Moths of Madagascar
Moths of Africa